Stefanos Souloukos (born 4 January 2001) is a Greek professional footballer who plays as a goalkeeper for Super League 2 club AEL.

References

2001 births
Living people
Greek footballers
Greece youth international footballers
Super League Greece players
Super League Greece 2 players
Athlitiki Enosi Larissa F.C. players
Association football goalkeepers
Footballers from Larissa